Silver Star is a charity based in the United Kingdom. It specialises in raising awareness of diabetes.

In raising awareness the charity has contacted numerous celebrities including Bollywood actresses Shilpa Shetty and Kareena Kapoor.

Controversy 

Charity money was linked to hiring prostitutes for local politician Keith Vaz.

References

External links
Official

Health charities in the United Kingdom